Antheraeopsis is a genus of moths in the family Saturniidae first described by James Wood-Mason in 1886.

Species
Antheraeopsis assamensis (Helfer, 1837) – Assam silkmoth, muga silkworm
Antheraeopsis brunnea van Eecke, 1922
Antheraeopsis castanea Jordan, 1910
Antheraeopsis chengtuana Watson, 1923
Antheraeopsis formosana Sonan, 1937
Antheraeopsis mezops Bryk, 1944
Antheraeopsis paniki Naessig & Treadaway, 1998
Antheraeopsis rubiginea Toxopeus, 1940
Antheraeopsis rudloffi Brechlin, 2002
Antheraeopsis subvelata Bouvier, 1930
Antheraeopsis youngi Watson, 1915
Antheraeopsis yunnanensis Chu & Wang, 1993

References

Saturniinae
Moth genera